The 1997 Super 12 season was the second season of the Super 12, contested by rugby union teams from Australia, New Zealand and South Africa. The season ran from 28 February to 31 May 1997, with each team playing all the others once. At the end of the regular season, the top four teams entered the playoff semi finals, with the first placed team playing the fourth and the second placed team playing the third. The winner of each semi final qualified for the final, which was contested by the Auckland Blues and the ACT Brumbies at Eden Park, Auckland. The Auckland Blues won 23 – 7 to win their second Super 12 title.

While the three Australian and five New Zealand teams remained the same as the 1996 season, the South African teams made changes. Transvaal, after the changes of the political landscape of South Africa, became known as the Gauteng Lions, while Western Province, after not making the top four of the 1996 Currie Cup, were replaced by Free State of Bloemfontein.

Table

Points breakdown:
 4 points for a win
 2 points for a draw
 1 bonus point for a loss by seven points or less
 1 bonus point for scoring four or more tries in a match
The playoffs follow a 1 v 4, 2 v 3 system with the highest placed team at home

Regular season

Round 1

Round 2

Round 3

Round 4

Round 5

Round 6

Round 7

Round 8

Round 9

Round 10

Round 11

Round 12

Finals

Semi finals

Grand final

Attendances

Notes and references

Further reading
McIlraith, M. (2005).Ten Years of Super 12, Auckland: Hodder Moa. 

 
1997
 
 
 
1997 rugby union tournaments for clubs